The 2021 FIBA U20 Women's European Challengers were international basketball competitions which took place from 12 to 18 July 2021, replacing the cancelled 2021 FIBA U20 Women's European Championship.

History
The 2020 edition of FIBA U20 Women's European Championship was to be held in Sopron, Hungary but was postponed to 2021 due to COVID-19 pandemic. 
Since the pandemic continued in 2021, the FIBA Europe decided to hold alternative format of competition to replace traditional format of U20 Women's European Championship where 16 teams gather in one place.

Structure
 The events are to be played on a voluntary participation basis, with promotion/relegation to be frozen across Divisions A, B and C.
 The Top 18 ranked teams (16 currently in Division A, plus two additional teams by 2019 ranking in respective category) to play three tournaments of six teams each (Groups A, B and C).
 All other registered teams, ranked 19 and lower, to play in tournaments of up to six teams each (Groups D and E).
 All tournaments to be played in Round Robin format, with groups to be created by "serpentine" style allocation, taking the hosting situation into consideration.

Participating teams

Top-18 Challengers
 
 
 
 
 
 
 
 
 
 
 
 
 
 
 
 
 
 

19–28 Challengers

Top-18 Challengers

Group A
The Group A tournament was played in Sofia, Bulgaria.

Group B
The Group B tournament was played in Sopron, Hungary.

Group C
The Group C tournament was played in Konya, Turkey.

19–28 Challengers

Group D
The Group D tournament was played in Yerevan, Armenia.

Group E
The Group E tournament was played in Skopje, North Macedonia.

See also
 2021 FIBA U20 European Challengers
 2021 FIBA U18 European Challengers
 2021 FIBA U16 European Challengers
 2021 FIBA U18 Women's European Challengers
 2021 FIBA U16 Women's European Challengers

References

External links
Official website
Competition schedule

FIBA Europe Under-20 Women's Challengers
 
Women's basketball competitions in Europe between national teams
Europe
Sports competitions in Sofia
Sport in Sopron
Sport in Konya
Sports competitions in Yerevan
Sports competitions in Skopje
July 2021 sports events in Europe
2021 in youth sport